I'll Follow You Down is a 2013 Canadian techno-thriller film written and directed by Richie Mehta.  Outside the United States and Canada, the film was released as Continuum.

Plot
In 2000, a professor from Toronto goes to Princeton, New Jersey, for a conference but does not return. Devastating his wife and young son Erol, he is eventually presumed dead. Twelve years later, Erol talks with his grandfather, who suggests that the father's disappearance might have been the result of a scientific experiment involving time travel. Erol is determined to find out the truth.

Erol is a mathematical genius and solves the equations necessary to recreate the time travel machine his father had built to go back in time to 1946. As he's working with his grandfather on this machine and the math and physics of it, Erol's girlfriend, Grace, becomes pregnant and makes him doubt the necessity of this endeavor. However, when Grace has a miscarriage, and Erol's mother commits suicide as a result of the loss and confusion of never knowing why her husband never returned, Erol realizes that this timeline that he's living in is a direct result of his father leaving. None of this would have happened naturally had his father come home. This time line is a dead-end and has to be corrected. With renewed vigor, Erol finishes the time machine. He uses the time machine to go back to 1946 and finds his father who is looking for Albert Einstein as he finished the work Einstein started. Erol reveals his identity and the chain of events which led him here to his father. He then reveals to him that, knowing his Dad's mind, he knew it wouldn't be that simple to convince him to come home. Erol tells him to go back home and give his family the life they deserve and to remember that he, Erol, is what he is because of his father's mistake. Then Erol shoots himself, dying instantly. This burns the message into his father's mind that he has to go back and prevent all of this from happening, which he does.

Cast
 Gillian Anderson as Marika
 Haley Joel Osment as Erol
 Rufus Sewell as Gabe
 Victor Garber as Sal
 John Paul Ruttan as Young Erol
 Kiara Glasco as Young Gracie
 Susanna Fournier as Grace

Reception

References

External links
 
 
 I'll Follow You Down – Summary, Synopsis and Review (by CultureCrypt)

2013 films
Canadian thriller films
English-language Canadian films
Techno-thriller films
Films shot in Ontario
Films about time travel
Films directed by Richie Mehta
Films scored by Andrew Lockington
Films set in 1946
Films set in 2000
Films set in 2012
2010s English-language films
2010s Canadian films